The history of black players in North American ice hockey has roots dating back to the late 19th century. The first black ice hockey star was Herb Carnegie during the Great Depression. Willie O'Ree broke the NHL's black color barrier with the Boston Bruins in 1958.

Coloured Hockey League
The Coloured Hockey League of the Maritimes began in 1895, as an initiative of black Baptist churches in Nova Scotia.  The aim was to increase and retain male membership. The league consisted of teams from Halifax, Africville, Hammond's Plains, Dartmouth, Truro, Amherst, and Charlottetown, P.E.I.  All games were on an invitational basis with the trophy still residing in a private home in Halifax, Nova Scotia. Historically, they were the first league to allow the goaltender to drop to the ice to stop the puck.

Ontario
Ontario is geographically large, and it was impossible in the early 20th century to organize an all-black league like in Nova Scotia. Some of the early black players in Ontario hockey history included Hipple Galloway and Fred Kelly. Galloway played as a member of the Woodstock team in the Central Ontario Hockey Association in 1899.
 In 1916, Fred (Bud) Kelly of London played for the 118 Battalion team of the Ontario Hockey League. Apparently, Kelly was scouted by the Toronto St. Pats, but was never officially contacted. One of the first all-black teams in Ontario was the Orioles. The team was from St. Catharines and played in the Niagara District Hockey League during the 1930s.

Herb Carnegie's hockey career began in 1938 with the Toronto Young Rangers and continued in the early 1940s with the Buffalo Ankerites, a team in a mines league that played in mining towns in northern Ontario and Quebec. While with the Ankerites, Carnegie was part of the Black Aces line. The other line members consisted of his brother, Ossie Carnegie, and Manny McIntyre, originally from Fredericton, New Brunswick. They were recognized as much for their talent and skill as their skin color (Herb was at center, Ossie was right wing, McIntyre was the left wing). In the semi-professional Quebec Provincial League, Herb was named most valuable player in 1946, 1947, and 1948.

In 1948, Carnegie was given a tryout with the New York Rangers and offered a contract to play in the Rangers' minor league system. However, he was offered less money than he was earning in the Quebec league and turned down all three offers made by the Rangers organization during his tryout.

WHA
 Alton White played for the New York Raiders, Los Angeles Sharks, Michigan Stags, and Baltimore Blades of the World Hockey Association (WHA). White is best known for being the second player of African descent, after Willie O'Ree, to have played on a professional major league ice hockey team. In addition, White is the first hockey player of African descent to score 20 goals in a single season. He did this for the Los Angeles Sharks during the 1972–73 season. During the same 72–73 season, he became the first black player in history to score a hat trick in a major league professional game.
 Tony McKegney was adopted and raised by a white family in Sarnia, Ontario. At age twenty, Tony McKegney signed a contract with the WHA's Birmingham Bulls, only to see the owner illegally renege on the deal after fans threatened to boycott the team for having added a black player to its roster. In the NHL, McKegney would go on to score over 300 career goals, including 40 in the 1987–88 season. His total of 78 points in the same season would remain the highest ever recorded by a black player until Jarome Iginla broke the record in 2001–02.

NHL

The NHL does not keep statistics on the percentages of ethnicities in the league.  However, outside sources have collected statistics on the number of black players in the NHL as well as the percentage of white players in the NHL.  According to an article by USA Today, 97% of the NHL is white, while the other 3% is made of different ethnicities.  Of the 3% of the remaining ethnicities, twenty-six are black. Twenty of the twenty-six black hockey players are from Canada while six are American. In all, the NHL is made up of 47.4% Canadians, 25.4% Americans, 9.0% Swedes, and the rest is made up by Russia, Finland, and a few other nations. Notable players of African American descent include Dustin Byfuglien, who is of Norwegian, African, and Swedish descent; Kyle Okposo, who is of Nigerian descent; and Joel Ward, whose ancestors are from Barbados.

A Sports Illustrated article in 1999 attributed the increase in black NHL players, in part, to significant demographic changes in Canada, the country which supplies the largest share of the league's players: "In 1971 there were only 34,445 black people in Canada ... 25 years later, after heavy immigration from British Commonwealth nations in the Caribbean, Canada had 573,860 black people (2% of the population)."

In 2019, the NHL designed a Black History Month mobile museum.  The mobile museum is a part of the "Hockey is For Everyone" campaign and is aimed to celebrate Black History Month.  The mobile museum is also a commemoration of the black players who have played in the NHL.  The museum completed an eight-city tour in the month of February, with its final stop being outside the Canadian embassy in Washington D.C.

Players
Willie O'Ree is referred to as the "Jackie Robinson of ice hockey" (and twice met Robinson personally, in O'Ree's own younger years) as the first black player in the National Hockey League (NHL). He was called up to the Boston Bruins of the NHL to replace an injured player. He made his NHL debut with the Bruins on January 18 of the 1957–58 NHL season, against the Montreal Canadiens, becoming the first black player in league history. O'Ree is still heavily involved with the NHL, in promoting the league's Diversity Program all over North America with amateur youth and adult hockey players.

Other firsts
 Mike Marson is a Black Canadian left winger. He was drafted in the 2nd Round, 19th overall by the Washington Capitals in the 1974 NHL Entry Draft, making him the first black player to be drafted in an NHL Entry Draft (first introduced in 1963). He became the second Black Canadian to play in the NHL. He played five seasons in the NHL for the Washington Capitals and the Los Angeles Kings. Mike Marson and Bill Riley (the third black player in the NHL) were also the first two black players to play in an NHL game together. They both played for the Capitals.
 Tony McKegney is a black Canadian, drafted by the Buffalo Sabres 32nd overall in 1979. Played in the NHL for Buffalo Sabres, Quebec Nordiques, Minnesota North Stars, New York Rangers, St. Louis Blues, Detroit Red Wings, Chicago Blackhawks from 1979 to 1991. He was the first black player to score 40 goals in a season. He played 912 regular season games, scoring 320 goals with 319 assists.
 Grant Fuhr is a black Canadian goaltender. Making his NHL debut in the 1981–82 season, he was the first black goalie in the NHL, and later became the first black player to win the Stanley Cup in 1984. Shortly after his retirement, in 2003, he became the first black player to be inducted into the Hockey Hall of Fame.
 Val James is an African American defenseman. He was the first American-born African American to play in the NHL, debuting with the Buffalo Sabres during the 1981–82 season. However, James was not the first African American player to be trained exclusively in the United States, as he played in the Canadian Major Junior Hockey League.
 Dirk Graham is a black Canadian right winger. He was the first black player to be named team captain, captaining the Chicago Blackhawks from 1989 to 1995. Graham was also the first black player to be awarded Selke Trophy for the best defensive forward in 1990–91 as well as the first black head coach, coaching the Blackhawks during the 1998–99 season.
 Mike Grier is an African American right winger. Born in Detroit, Michigan, he became the first African American player born and trained in the United States to play in the NHL, after making his NHL debut during the 1996–97 season. He would later become the first black general manager in the NHL, after being hired by the San Jose Sharks prior to the 2022–23 season. 
 Jarome Iginla is a black Canadian right winger. He is the Calgary Flames' all-time leader in goals, points, and games played. Iginla is the first black NHL player to win the Art Ross Trophy (leading point scorer) and the first to win the Maurice "Rocket" Richard Trophy (leading goal scorer), both in 2002. As a member of the Canadian men's national hockey team in the 2002 Winter Olympics, he became the first black man to win any gold medal at the Winter Olympics.
 Johnny Oduya is an African Swedish defenceman, whose father was a Luo from Kenya. He became the first European-trained player of African descent to play in the NHL, after making his NHL debut during the 2006–07 season.
 P. K. Subban is a black Canadian defenceman, whose father immigrated to Canada from Jamaica. He was the first black player to win the award for the League's best defenceman, the James Norris Memorial Trophy in 2013.
 Wayne Simmonds is a black Canadian right winger. He was the first black player to be awarded the NHL All-Star Game MVP in 2017.
 Claude Vilgrain is a Haitian-born Canadian Hockey player. He played 89 NHL games with the Vancouver Canucks, New Jersey Devils, and Philadelphia Flyers. He played in the 1988 Olympics for Team Canada. He was raised in Quebec City, Quebec.
 Quinton Byfield of the Sudbury Wolves of the OHL set a record for being the highest-ever selected black player in the NHL Entry Draft, being picked by the Los Angeles Kings at 2nd overall in the 2020 Entry Draft.

Management
In July 2022, the San Jose Sharks hired Mike Grier as general manager, making him the first black American to serve as general manager.

Officiating
On April 3, 2001, Jay Sharrers made NHL history as the first black referee to officiate an NHL game. He worked his first game as an NHL ref when the Philadelphia Flyers faced the visiting Florida Panthers.

Racial incidents in the NHL 
During the 1958 season, Canadian born Willie O’Ree became the first player of African descent to join the National Hockey League.  Playing a short career of only 45 games, O’Ree faced racism after being recalled from the Canadian minor leagues. While in the minor leagues, O’Ree recalls the racism he faced as predominantly muted. However, as soon as O’Ree entered into the NHL, racist remarks and actions by hostile fans and players appeared. While playing in America, O’Ree recalled one racial incident where Chicago Blackhawks forward Eric Nesterenko yelled racial slurs at O’Ree and butt-ended O’Ree with his stick. The event caused fights to break out between all players of each team and a police escort was required for O’Ree to leave the building safely. O’Ree has stated that the racism had not affected him in his playing career. In addition, any racial slurs, according to him, "would go in one ear, and out the other." O’Ree cites his brother as his main inspiration to become the first black hockey player. He found that if the fans were against him playing because of his skin color, he may as well ignore it and focus on what he does best. This motivation led Willie O’Ree to be named the "Jackie Robinson" of hockey by the NHL community.

When O’Ree first entered the league as the first ice hockey player of African descent, he received no recognition by the league or the media.  The media did not publish any articles that the color line in hockey had been broken.  Some newspapers who reported about the first game O’Ree played in confused O’Ree's first name Willie, as Billy.  O’Ree himself noted, “It didn’t really dawn on me then,” that he had broken the color barrier in professional hockey.  When Val James first entered the league in 1981, the NHL did not make any recognition of him being the first African American in the NHL.

Nowadays, O’Ree serves as the NHL Diversity Ambassador and aims to raise participation of hockey by all races through hosting programs at local ice arenas.  These programs include learn to skate clinics as well as youth hockey development clinics for children of multi ethnic backgrounds.  The main goal of the clinics is to increase the diversity of hockey and allow children who are unfamiliar with the sport to have a chance at trying it out.  The clinics also address the issue of race within the hockey community.  O’Ree's personal goals are to communicate that, “Your race can’t keep you from succeeding,” to the younger children and to share how he overcame the racism he faced during his career.

The first American born player of African descent in the NHL was Val James.  James's short career was spent with the Toronto Maple Leafs and the Buffalo Sabres.  James recalls fans taunting him with racial slurs as well as players committing penalties and fights against him because of his skin color.  In an interview with James, he states that he could not watch another hockey game for ten years due to the events of his NHL career haunting him.  Val James found the most intensive racism to be in the United States.  During his career with the Buffalo Sabres, Val James recalls beer bottles being thrown at him when entering the arena as well as fans shouting racial slurs at him.

Modern-day racial incidents in the NHL come in many different forms; however, the most prominent are player and spectator interactions.  According to an interview with Washington Capitals forward Devante Smith-Pelly, “As a Black hockey player, he [Smith-Pelly] knew exactly what they meant by, ‘Basketball, basketball, basketball!’”  In this case, the spectators are taunting Smith-Pelly that he is better suited to play basketball, since the majority of the NBA is African American.  Smith-Pelly states that this incident was “just ignorant people being ignorant.”

Many other racist incidents during hockey games have also occurred. During a preseason game, while playing for the Philadelphia Flyers, Wayne Simmonds had a banana thrown at him by a fan. Simmonds’ response to this event was very similar to Smith-Pelly's.  He believes that a strong example should be set by including a zero-tolerance policy in the NHL. With this policy enacted, any racist remarks or gestures would cause an immediate ejection from the arena and a subsequent ban from attending that organization's games.

NHL commissioner Gary Bettman has supported his players wishes by including the zero-tolerance policy for racism. According to Gary Bettman, “Even if it’s only one incident it is one too many.”   The NHL has taken increasing action in the past few years against racist events, even banning four fans from the United Center and all future Chicago Blackhawks events.  Commissioner Gary Bettman has also raised awareness of racist incidents around the league by dedicating the month of February to be “Hockey is for Everyone Month”. The event starts on February 1, the same date as Black History Month, and has the goal of raising awareness of equality throughout the league.  Players tape their sticks with pride tape that represents awareness of equality, respect, and inclusion.  In addition, many different programs take place across the nation to include players with disabilities. The event is also promoted through social media with the hashtag HockeyIsForEveryone.

Although the NHL has taken strong actions against racism in the league, players still believe there is a large issue at hand.  Most players, including Smith-Pelly and Evander Kane of the San Jose Sharks, believe that the NHL has still a long way to go.  In their words, race as an issue in the NHL will continue to exist, due to similar incidents occurring in the NHL both sixty years ago and today.  O’Ree has a hopeful outlook for the future of hockey's diversity.  He has stated, “There’s more kids of colour playing hockey today than ever before, and more girls.”   Furthermore, many players are optimistic that the NHL community has gathered around to protect its players from racist incidents.

IIHF
 On May 11, 2003, Anson Carter scored on Mikael Tellqvist of Sweden to lead Canada to the gold medal at the 2003 IIHF Men's World Hockey Championships.
 In 2008, Angela James became the first black woman inducted in the International Ice Hockey Federation Hall of Fame. She also scored 11 goals during the 1990 Women's World Hockey Championships tournament, a record that still stands today. James has won four world championship gold medals, two 3 Nations Cup gold medals and one IIHF Pacific Rim Championship gold medal with Canada's National Women's Team.

Women's hockey
Angela James played in the Central Ontario Women's Hockey League, precursor to the National Women's Hockey League and Canadian Women's Hockey League. She represented Team Canada internationally. She scored 34 points (22g, 12a) in 20 games over four women's world championships, including 11 goals in five games in the inaugural IIHF World Women's Championships, held in Ottawa in 1990. In 2008, she, along with Cammi Granato (USA) and Geraldine Heaney (CAN), became the first women to be inducted into the International Ice Hockey Federation Hockey Hall of Fame. James is the daughter of a black father and white mother; she is the only Black Canadian to captain a national hockey team.

Career stats

Franchise career
These are the top-ten point, goal, and assist scorers in any franchise history. Figures are updated after each completed NHL regular season.

Note: Pos = Position; GP = Games played; G = Goals; A = Assists; Pts = Points; P/G = Points per game; G/G = Goals per game; A/G = Assists per game; * = Active player; Bold = Currently playing

NHL career
These are the top-ten point, goal, and assist scorers in NHL history. Figures are updated after each completed NHL regular season.

Note: Pos = Position; GP = Games played; G = Goals; A = Assists; Pts = Points; P/G = Points per game; G/G = Goals per game; A/G = Assists per game; * = Active player

Historic firsts
 First black player to sign an NHL contract: Art Dorrington (August 1950)
 First black player to sign a contract with an NHL team: John Utendale (1955)
 First black player in an NHL game: Willie O'Ree (January 18, 1958)
 First black head coach in the NCAA: Ed Wright, Buffalo Bulls (1970–71)
 First black player to surpass 20 goals in a single season: Alton White, Los Angeles Sharks, WHA, 1972–73 season
 First black player to surpass 100 PIM in a NHL season: Bill Riley (1976–77)
 First black player to surpass 20 goals in a single NHL season: Tony McKegney (1979–80)
 First black goalie in the NHL: Grant Fuhr (1981–82)
 First black player to surpass 100 goals in the NHL: Tony McKegney (1982–83)
 First black player to win the Stanley Cup: Grant Fuhr (1983–84)
 First black player to surpass 500 NHL Points: Tony McKegney (1987–88)
 First black player to surpass 200 NHL Wins: Grant Fuhr (1988–89)
 First black player to win the Frank J. Selke Trophy: Dirk Graham (1990–91)
 First black player to win the William M. Jennings: Grant Fuhr (1993–94)
 First black player to surpass 200 PIM in a NHL season: Donald Brashear (1995–96)
 First black player to earn 20 shutouts: Grant Fuhr (1996–97)
 First black player to surpass 1,000 PIM in the NHL: Donald Brashear (1997–98)
 First black head coach in the NHL: Dirk Graham (1998–99 Chicago Blackhawks)
 First black player to surpass 400 NHL Wins: Grant Fuhr (1999–00)
 First black player to surpass 50 goals in a single NHL season: Jarome Iginla (2001–02)
 First black player in the Hockey Hall of Fame: Grant Fuhr (2003)
 First black player to surpass 2,000 PIM in the NHL: Donald Brashear (2005–06)
 First black player to surpass 500 goals in the NHL: Jarome Iginla (2011–12)
 First black player to win the James Norris Memorial Trophy: P. K. Subban (2012–13)

American born
 First American born black player in a NHL game: Val James (1981–82)
 First American-born and exclusively American-trained black player in a NHL game: Mike Grier (1996–97)
 First American born black player to surpass 1,000 PIM in the NHL: Donald Brashear (1997–98)
 First American born black player to surpass 20 goals in a single NHL season: Mike Grier (1998–99)
 First American born black goalie in the NHL: Gerald Coleman (2005–06)
 First American born black player to play 1,000 NHL Games: Donald Brashear (2009–10)
 First American born black player to win the Stanley Cup: Dustin Byfuglien (2009–10)

Others
 First black captain for Canadian national team: Angela James (1990)
 First black coach in professional hockey: John Paris Jr. of Windsor, Nova Scotia become the first black coach in professional hockey with the Atlanta Knights in 1994
 First black player to win a gold medal at the Winter Olympics: Jarome Iginla (2002)
 First time two black players played in the NHL in the same game: Mike Marson and Bill Riley
 First black TV analyst in hockey: Kevin Weekes Weekes provides color commentary for NHL games on the NHL Network and Hockey Night in Canada.
 In 2020, the only African American agents in the NHL Players' Association were Eustace King, Brett Peterson and Harkie Singh.

See also

 Race and sports
 Race and ethnicity in the NHL
 Race and ethnicity in the NBA
 Baseball color line
 List of first black Major League Baseball players
 Negro league baseball
 List of Negro league baseball players
 Black players in professional American football
 Racial issues faced by black quarterbacks
 List of black quarterbacks
 List of African-American sports firsts

Footnotes

References

African-American sports history
History of Black people in Canada

Black